José Alvarado may refer to: 

Brazo de Plata (1963–2021), Mexican wrestler, born José Alvarado Nieves
José Alvarado (swimmer) (born 1953), swimmer
José Alvarado (baseball) (born 1995), baseball player
Jose Alvarado (basketball) (born 1998), basketball player
José María Alvarado (1813–1846), killed in what was known as the Pauma Massacre